The IBM Academy of Technology was founded on May 31, 1989 and modeled after the US National Academies of Sciences and Engineering.  t focuses on the technical underpinnings of IBM’s future. Its membership consists of over 700 of IBM's technical leaders from around the world who are working in research, hardware and software development and manufacturing.

Members are selected to the academy by their peers. Membership carries with it responsibilities such as engaging in academy-sponsored activities and promoting technical growth IBM-wide. Original members of the IBM Academy of Technology included Leo Esaki, Gerd Binnig, Benoit Mandelbrot, Rolf Landauer, Jim Gray, Lubomyr Romankiw and Mike Cowlishaw.

Past Presidents
 1989 Ed Sussenguth  
 1990 Dick Chu
 1991 Al Cutaia
 1992 Rick Dill
 1993 Jim Brady
 1994 Fran Allen 
 1995 Russ Lange
 1996 Fred Ris
 1997 Bob Guernsey
 1999 Ian Brackenbury
 2001 Lewis Terman
 2003 Dave Ehnebuske
 2005 William Tetzlaff
 2007 Joanne Martin
 2009 Emily Plachy
 2012 Rashik Parmar
 2014 Andrea Martin
 2016 Susan Schreitmueller Smartt
 2019 Richard Hopkins

References

External links
IBM's Academy of Technology
Academy Blog

Academy of Technology